The 2019 Combined Slovenian Championships were the first Slovenian national championships for competition climbing in combined format. It was held in Celje, Slovenia from 14 to 16 June 2019. The athletes competed in speed, bouldering, and lead disciplines, and the combined results of those disciplines would determine the winners. The winner for men was Jernej Kruder and for women was Janja Garnbret.

Competition format 
It was held based on and to simulate the latest Olympic combined format.

Athletes were ranked based on their scores in separate disciplines. Points were calculated by multiplying the ranks of each athlete in the three disciplines.

Men 
The final round started with speed race, which in the final race Jernej Kruder false started, giving an easy win for Žiga Zajc. Next in the bouldering, Kruder made amends by topping all three boulder problems in five attempts, just one attempt less than the second place, Anže Peharc. Lastly in the lead, Domen Škofic leading the way, though not topping the route, and Kruder placed second which ultimately made him the winner of the competition. Škofic took second place, and Peharc third.

Women 
The finals started with speed discipline, where Urška Repušič won after Janja Garnbret false started in the final race. Next in the bouldering, Vita Lukan led the way by topping all three boulder problems in just four attempts, where the second place Lučka Rakovec needed one more and the third place Janja Garnbret needed two more attempts. Coming to the last climbs in lead, the competition was very tight as there were three people with combined points of 6 and one with 7 so far. Two people topped the route, and the faster one, Garnbret, became the winner, and Rakovec took second place. In the end, after multiplying the ranks of each event, Garnbret became the women's champion of combined nationals, Rakovec closely behind in second place, and Lukan completing the podium in third place.

References

External links 

 Slovenian Commission for Sport Climbing (Planinska zveza Slovenije Komisija za športno plezanje) - Official website 

2019 in sport climbing
Climbing competitions